The Flyer was a brass era automobile manufactured in Mt. Clemens, Michigan by the Flyer Motor Car Company from 1913 to 1914.  The Flyer had a monobloc four-cylinder water-cooled engine with selective transmission.

References
 

Defunct motor vehicle manufacturers of the United States
Motor vehicle manufacturers based in Michigan
Companies based in Macomb County, Michigan